Robert W. Cullingford (born 1953) is an English former professional footballer who played in defence.

He was born in Bradford and joined Bradford City's youth set up after being picked up from local leagues. He became the club's youngest player aged 16 years 141 days on 22 April 1970 in a Division Three game against Mansfield Town in a 1–0 defeat. He played just one more game two seasons later before he joined Morecambe.

References

1953 births
Living people
Footballers from Bradford
Bradford City A.F.C. players
Morecambe F.C. players
English Football League players
English footballers
Association football defenders